Shooting events at the 1983 Southeast Asian Games was held between 29 May to 5 June at Mount Vernon Shooting Club, Singapore.

Medal summary

Men's

Women's

Medal table

References
 https://eresources.nlb.gov.sg/newspapers/Digitised/Article/straitstimes19830530-1.2.106
 https://eresources.nlb.gov.sg/newspapers/Digitised/Article/straitstimes19830531-1.2.123
 https://eresources.nlb.gov.sg/newspapers/Digitised/Article/straitstimes19830601-1.2.137
 https://eresources.nlb.gov.sg/newspapers/Digitised/Article/straitstimes19830602-1.2.102
 https://eresources.nlb.gov.sg/newspapers/Digitised/Article/straitstimes19830603-1.2.129
 https://eresources.nlb.gov.sg/newspapers/Digitised/Article/straitstimes19830604-1.2.113
 https://eresources.nlb.gov.sg/newspapers/Digitised/Article/straitstimes19830605-1.2.78.27
 https://eresources.nlb.gov.sg/newspapers/Digitised/Article/straitstimes19830606-1.2.102

Shooting at the Southeast Asian Games